Ptelea (before 1951: Φτελιά Ftelia) is a village in the northern part of the Evros regional unit, Greece. It is part of the municipal unit of Trigono. In 2011 its population was 441. It is located on the right bank of the river Evros, where it forms the border with Bulgaria. It is bypassed by the Greek National Road 51/E85 (Alexandroupoli - Orestiada - Ormenio - Svilengrad). The town was formerly known as Karagatsoudi (Καραγατσούδι) and El-Karakas (Ελ-Καράκας), its Turkish name was Karaagaç. The nearest villages are Dikaia to its east, and Ormenio to its northwest.

History
Ptelea was founded in 1924 by refugees from Eastern Thrace. In 1997 under the Capodistrian Plan, the community of Ptelea became part of the new municipality of Trigono with 11 other former communities. At the Kallikratis reform, it became part of the municipality of Orestiada.

Population

Transport

Road
Ptelea is bypassed by the Greek National Road 51/European route E85 (Feres - Soufli - Orestiada - Ormenio), which continues across the border as the Bulgarian road 80 to Svilengrad.

Rail
The community is served by Ptelea railway stop, one of the most northernly railway stations in Greece. The station is served by Alexandroupoli–Svilengrad line.

See also

List of settlements in the Evros regional unit

External links
El-Karakas
Ptelea
Ptelea on GTP Travel Pages

References

Populated places in Evros (regional unit)